Sverre Idland is a Norwegian sport shooter who has won the IPSC Nordic Rifle Championship overall Standard title 4 times, and the IPSC Norwegian Rifle Championship title 16 times, and is thereby the Norwegian with the most medals and wins from the Norwegian championships in practical shooting.

References 
 DSSN Hall of Fame
 TriggerFreeze.com - IPSC Rifle Norway

IPSC shooters
Norwegian male sport shooters
Living people
Year of birth missing (living people)